Ashburton Art Gallery is an art gallery located in the town of Ashburton, New Zealand. It is owned by the Ashburton District Council and located in the Ashburton Art Gallery and Heritage Centre. The gallery moved from a building in Baring Square into its current facility in February 2015. The building was originally built as the offices for Ashburton County Council and designed by Christchurch-based Cecil Wood and local architect W. Thomas.

The gallery holds a collection of works by Ashburton-born children's book author and illustrator David Elliot, including  drawings from books such as The Making of the Word Witch (a collaboration with Margaret Mahy), The Moon and Farmer McPhee and Lewis Carroll's The Hunting of the Snark.

The gallery partners with the Zonta International Club of Ashburton to offer an annual Zonta Ashburton Female Art Award. Along with a cash prize, the winner wins the opportunity to hold a solo exhibition in the gallery.

References

Art galleries in New Zealand
Ashburton, New Zealand
City and town halls in New Zealand